Oh! What a Lovely War is a 1969 British comedy musical war film directed by Richard Attenborough (in his directorial debut), with an ensemble cast, including Maggie Smith, Dirk Bogarde, John Gielgud, John Mills, Kenneth More, Laurence Olivier, Jack Hawkins, Corin Redgrave, Michael Redgrave, Vanessa Redgrave, Ralph Richardson, Ian Holm, Paul Shelley, Malcolm McFee, Jean-Pierre Cassel, Nanette Newman, Edward Fox, Susannah York, John Clements, Phyllis Calvert and Maurice Roëves.

The film is based on the stage musical Oh, What a Lovely War!, originated by Charles Chilton as the radio play The Long Long Trail in December 1961, and transferred to stage by Gerry Raffles in partnership with Joan Littlewood and her Theatre Workshop in 1963.

The title is derived from the music hall song "Oh! It's a Lovely War", which is one of the major numbers in the film.

Synopsis
Oh! What a Lovely War summarises and comments on the events of World War I using popular songs of the time, many of which were parodies of older popular songs, and using allegorical settings such as Brighton's West Pier to criticise the manner in which the eventual victory was won.

The diplomatic maneuvering and events involving those in authority are set in a fantasy location inside the pierhead pavilion, far from the trenches. In the opening scene, various foreign ministers, generals and heads of state walk over a huge map of Europe, reciting actual words spoken by these figures at the time. An unnamed photographer takes a picture of Europe's rulers – after handing two red poppies to the Archduke Ferdinand and his wife, the Duchess of Hohenberg, he takes their picture, "assassinating" them as the flash goes off. Many of the heads of state enjoy good personal relations and are reluctant to go to war: a tearful Emperor Franz Josef declares war on Serbia after being deceived by his Foreign Minister, and Czar Nicholas II and Kaiser Wilhelm II are shown as unable to overrule their countries' military mobilisation schedules. The German invasion of Belgium leaves Sir Edward Grey little choice but to get involved. Italy reneges on its alliance with the Central Powers (it joined the Allies in 1915) but Turkey joins them instead.

The start of the war in 1914 is shown as a parade of optimism. The protagonists are an archetypal British family of the time, the Smiths, who are shown entering Brighton's West Pier, with General Haig selling tickets – the film later follows the young Smith men through their experiences in the trenches. A military band rouses holidaymakers from the beach to rally round and follow – some even literally boarding a bandwagon. The first Battle of Mons is similarly cheerfully depicted yet more realistic in portrayal. Both scenes are flooded in pleasant sunshine.

When the casualties start to mount, a theatre audience is rallied by singing "Are We Downhearted? No!" A chorus line dressed in frilled yellow dresses, recruits a volunteer army with "We don't want to lose you, but we think you ought to go". A music hall star (Maggie Smith) then enters a lone spotlight, and lures the still doubtful young men in the audience into "taking the King's Shilling" by singing about how every day she "walks out" with different men in uniform, and that "On Saturday I'm willing, if you'll only take the shilling, to make a man of any one of you." The young men take to the stage and are quickly moved offstage and into military life, and the initially alluring music hall singer is depicted on close-up as a coarse, over-made-up harridan.

The red poppy crops up again as a symbol of impending death, often being handed to a soldier about to be sent to die. These scenes are juxtaposed with the pavilion, now housing the top military brass. There is a scoreboard (a dominant motif in the original theatre production) showing the loss of life and "yards gained".

Outside, Sylvia Pankhurst (Vanessa Redgrave) is shown addressing a hostile crowd on the futility of war, upbraiding them for believing everything they read in the newspapers. She is met with catcalls and jeered from her podium.

1915 is depicted as darkly contrasting in tone. Many shots of a parade of wounded men illustrate an endless stream of grim, hopeless faces. Black humour among these soldiers has now replaced the enthusiasm of the early days. "There's a Long, Long Trail a-Winding" captures the new mood of despair, depicting soldiers filing along in torrential rain in miserable conditions. Red poppies provide the only bright colour in these scenes. In a scene of British soldiers drinking in an estaminet, a Soubrette (Pia Colombo) leads them in a jolly chorus of "The Moon Shines Bright on Charlie Chaplin", a reworking of an American song then shifts the mood back to darker tone by singing a soft and sombre version of "Adieu la vie". At the end of the year, amidst more manoeuvres in the pavilion, General (later Field Marshal) Douglas Haig replaces Field Marshal Sir John French as Commander-in-Chief of the British Forces. Haig is then mocked by Australian troops who see him inspecting British soldiers; they sing "They were only playing Leapfrog" to the tune of "John Brown's Body".

An interfaith religious service is held in a ruined abbey. A priest tells the gathered soldiers that each religion has endorsed the war by way of allowing soldiers to eat pork if Jewish, meat on Fridays if Catholic, and work through the sabbath if in service of the war for all religions. He also says the Dalai Lama has blessed the war effort.

1916 passes and the film's tone darkens again. The songs contain contrasting tones of wistfulness, stoicism and resignation, including "The Bells of Hell Go Ting-a-ling-a-ling", "If the Sergeant Steals Your Rum, Never Mind" and "Hanging on the Old Barbed Wire". The wounded are laid out in ranks at the field station, a stark contrast to the healthy rows of young men who entered the war. The camera often lingers on Harry Smith's silently suffering face.

The Americans arrive, but are shown only in the "disconnected reality" of the pavilion, interrupting the deliberations of the British generals by singing "Over There" with the changed final line: "And we won't come back – we'll be buried over there!" The resolute-looking American captain seizes the map from an astonished Haig.

Jack notices with disgust that after three years of fighting, he is literally back where he started, at Mons. As the Armistice is sounding, Jack is the last one to die. There is a splash of red which at first glance appears to be blood, but which turns out to be yet another poppy out of focus in the foreground. Jack's spirit wanders through the battlefield, and he eventually finds himself in the room where the elder statesmen of Europe are drafting the coming peace – but they are oblivious to his presence. Jack finally finds himself on a tranquil hillside, where he joins his brothers for a lie down on the grass, where their figures morph into crosses. The film closes with a long slow pan out that ends in a dizzying aerial view of countless soldiers' graves, as the voices of the dead sing "We'll Never Tell Them" (a parody of the Jerome Kern song "They Didn't Believe Me").

Cast (in credits order)

Smith family

 Wendy Allnutt as Flo Smith
 Colin Farrell (not the Irish-born Hollywood actor of the same name) as Harry Smith
 Malcolm McFee as Freddie Smith
 John Rae as Grandpa Smith
 Corin Redgrave as Bertie Smith
 Maurice Roëves as George Smith
 Paul Shelley as Jack Smith
 Kim Smith as Dickie Smith
 Angela Thorne as Betty Smith
 Mary Wimbush as Mary Smith

At the time, the Beatles were interested in making an anti-war film. At Bertrand Russell’s suggestion, Paul McCartney met with the producer Len Deighton to discuss the opportunity of the band portraying the Smith family although in the end it was not possible to arrange.

Also starring

Vincent Ball as Australian Soldier
Pia Colombo as Estaminet Singer
Paul Daneman as Czar Nicholas II
Isabel Dean as Sir John French's Lady
Christian Doermer as Fritz
Robert Flemyng as Staff Officer in Gassed Trench
Meriel Forbes as Lady Grey
Frank Forsyth as Woodrow Wilson
Ian Holm as President Poincaré
David Lodge as Recruiting Sergeant
Joe Melia as the Photographer
Guy Middleton as Sir William Robertson
Juliet Mills as Nurse
Nanette Newman as Nurse
Cecil Parker as Sir John
Natasha Parry as Sir William Robertson's Lady
Gerald Sim as Chaplain
Thorley Walters as Staff Officer in Ballroom
Anthony Ainley as Third Aide
Michael Bates as Drunk Lance Corporal
Fanny Carby as Mill Girl
Cecilia Darby as Sir Henry Wilson's Lady
Geoffrey Davies as Aide
Edward Fox as Aide
George Ghent as Heckler
Zeph Gladstone as Chauffer (uncredited)
Peter Gilmore as Private Burgess
Ben Howard as Private Garbett
Norman Jones as Scottish Soldier
Paddy Joyce as Irish Soldier
Angus Lennie as Scottish Soldier
Harry Locke as Heckler
Clifford Mollison as Heckler
Derek Newark as Shooting Gallery Proprietor
John Owens as Seamus Moore
Ron Pember as Corporal at Station
Dorothy Reynolds as Heckler
Norman Shelley as Staff Officer in Ballroom
Marianne Stone as Mill Girl
John Trigger as Officer at Station
Kathleen Wileman as Emma Smith at Age 4
Penelope Allen as Solo Chorus Girl
Maurice Arthur as Soldier Singer
Freddie Ascott as 'Whizzbang' Soldier
Dinny Jones as Chorus Girl 
Carole Gray as Chorus Girl
Bernard Jarvis as the whistling blowing soldier in the trench
Jane Seymour as Chorus Girl (uncredited and film debut)

Guest stars
Dirk Bogarde as Stephen
Phyllis Calvert as Lady Haig
Jean-Pierre Cassel as French Colonel
John Clements as General von Moltke
John Gielgud as Count Leopold Berchtold
Jack Hawkins as Emperor Franz Josef I
Kenneth More as Kaiser Wilhelm II
Laurence Olivier as Field Marshal Sir John French
Michael Redgrave as Sir Henry Wilson 
Vanessa Redgrave as Sylvia Pankhurst
Ralph Richardson as Sir Edward Grey
Maggie Smith as Music Hall Star
Susannah York as Eleanor
John Mills as General (later Field Marshal) Sir Douglas Haig

Production
The producers were the novelist Len Deighton, photographer Brian Duffy and Richard Attenborough, who was making his directorial debut. The Deighton Duffy production company had produced the film adaptation of Deighton’s Only When I Larf starring Richard Attenborough. Deighton wrote the screenplay for Oh! What a Lovely War and the opening title sequence was created by Len Deighton's lifelong friend Raymond Hawkey, the designer responsible for many of Deighton's book covers in the 1960s. In an attempt to shame other people who he thought were claiming credit for things they hadn't actually done, Deighton decided not to be listed in the film credits, a gesture he later described as "stupid and infantile".

The 1969 film transferred the mise-en-scène completely into the cinematic domain, with elaborate sequences shot at West Pier in Brighton, elsewhere in Brighton and on the South Downs, interspersed with motifs from the stage production. These included the 'cricket' scoreboards showing the number of dead, but Deighton did not use the pierrot costumes. However, as many critics, including Pauline Kael, noted, the treatment diminished the effect of the numbers of deaths, which appear only fleetingly. Nonetheless, Deighton’s final sequence, ending in a helicopter shot of thousands of war graves is regarded as one of the most memorable moments of the film. According to Attenborough, 16,000 white crosses had to be hammered into individually dug holes due to the hardness of the soil. Although this is effective in symbolising the scale of death, the number of crosses was in fact fewer than the number of deaths in a single battle: depicting the actual number would have required the scale to have been replicated more than 1000 times.

The film was shot in the summer of 1968 in Sussex, mostly in the Brighton area. Many of the extras were local people, but a great many were students from the University of Sussex, Falmer, on the outskirts of the town. The film's locations included the West Pier (now gutted by fire and wrecked), Ditchling Beacon, Sheepcote Valley (the trench sequences), Old Bayham Abbey, near Frant (the church parade), Brighton station and Ovingdean (where thousands of crosses were erected for the classic finale).

The song
The song was written by J. P. Long and Maurice Scott in 1917 and was part of the repertoire of music hall star and male impersonator Ella Shields. The first verse and the chorus follow:

Two pre-musical renditions, one from 1918, can be found at Firstworldwar.com. Almost all of the songs featured in the film also appear on the CD41 album series Oh! It's a Lovely War (four volumes).

Reception
Vincent Canby of The New York Times called it "a big, elaborate, sometimes realistic film whose elephantine physical proportions and often brilliant all-star cast simply overwhelm the material with a surfeit of good intentions." Variety called the film "dedicated, exhilarating, shrewd, mocking, funny, emotional, witty, poignant and technically brilliant." Roger Ebert of the Chicago Sun Times gave the film 4 stars out of 4, writing that it was not a movie but "an elaborately staged tableau, a dazzling use of the camera to achieve essentially theatrical effects. And judged on that basis, Richard Attenborough has given us a breathtaking evening." Gene Siskel of the Chicago Tribune also gave the film a perfect grade of 4 stars and wrote it "deserves an Academy Award nomination for the best picture of the year ... You can sit back and enjoy this film on any one of many levels. The songs are good, the lyrics are biting; the staging and costuming blend with the story rather than overshadow it. The acting seems effortless." Kevin Thomas of the Los Angeles Times wrote: "What noted British actor Richard Attenborough, in a dazzling directorial debut, and his principal writers Len Deighton and Brian Duffy have done is to transform the highly political and one-dimensional Joan Littlewood theatre piece into timeless—and painfully timely—tragic allegory." Gary Arnold of The Washington Post wrote: "The conception is intriguing, but the film turns into an infernal, precision machine. As one big production number succeeded the other and one perfectly measured and symmetrical tableau faded into the next, I began to feel stupefied rather than touched. The physical production was rolling over the songs, the characters and the vignettes." David Wilson of The Monthly Film Bulletin wrote that "one is simply left admiring a worthy mosaic of bits and pieces, full of good ideas but nowhere near to being a self-contained dramatic entity."

The film presently has a score of 80% on Rotten Tomatoes based on 15 reviews, with an average grade of 8.2 out of 10.

The Toronto Star received complaints from veteran organizations about the advertisement for the film that featured cemetery crosses and later ran the adverts without the image.

Box office
It ranked the 16th film at the UK box office in 1969.

Accolades

References in popular culture
 English rock band Colonel Bagshot released an anti-war album of the same name in 1971, their first and only long play.
 BBC Radio 4's 15 Minute Musical portrayed Tony Blair's premiership in the style of Oh! What a Lovely War in a September 2006 episode entitled "Oh! What a Lovely Blair".
 At a Google Talks event, James Rado, one of the original writers and creators of Hair, stated that Oh! What a Lovely War was what made him want to work on a musical dealing with war.Archived at Ghostarchive and the Wayback Machine: 
 The song "The Bells of Hell Go Ting-a-ling-a-ling" was used as the play-out music for Ned Sherrin's 1964 BBC-TV show Not So Much a Programme, More a Way of Life.
 Babyshambles named their live album Oh! What a Lovely Tour after this film.

References

Citations

Sources

 Banham, Martin, ed. 1998. The Cambridge Guide to Theatre. Cambridge: Cambridge University Press. .
 Brockett, Oscar G. and Franklin J. Hildy. 2003. History of the Theatre. Ninth edition, International edition. Boston: Allyn and Bacon. .
 Eyre, Richard and Nicholas Wright. 2000. Changing Stages: A View of British Theatre in the Twentieth Century. London: Bloomsbury. .

External links

Oh! It's A Lovely War album series at CD41
Len Deighton article on producing the film, on the Deighton Dossier website

1969 films
1960s musical films
1969 war films
British musical films
British war films
Western Front (World War I) films
Anti-war films about World War I
Films directed by Richard Attenborough
Films set in Brighton
Films produced by Richard Attenborough
Paramount Pictures films
Christmas truce
Cultural depictions of Nicholas II of Russia
Cultural depictions of Wilhelm II
Cultural depictions of Woodrow Wilson
Cultural depictions of Douglas Haig, 1st Earl Haig
Anti-war comedy films
1969 directorial debut films
Films based on musicals
Musical films based on actual events
1960s English-language films
1960s British films